The Suzuki Equator was a mid-size pickup truck based on the Nissan Navara and assembled by Nissan. It was first sold in the US for the 2009 model year with prices starting at $17,220, and made its debut at the 2008 Chicago Auto Show.

The Equator was offered as either a four-seat Extended Cab or a five-seat Crew Cab. In the Canadian market, the Equator is only offered in the Crew Cab configuration, in a single trim level.

Power on base Extended Cab models comes from a 4-cylinder engine. A V6 is optional on Extended Cab models and standard with the Crew Cab. Both engines are supplied by Nissan.

It comes with either a five-speed manual transmission or a five-speed automatic.

It comes standard with a five-speed automatic and is available with four-wheel-drive.

The Equator won Peterson's 4Wheel & Off-RoadS 2009 4x4 of the Year, beating out the Dodge Ram 1500, Ford F150, Hummer H3, Kia Borrego, and Toyota Sequoia. Sales of the Suzuki Equator since 2009 have been 5,808 overall, and it rarely sold over 200 units per month.

The Suzuki Equator was discontinued in 2010 for the Canadian market and 2012 for the United States market.

See also
 Nissan Frontier

References

Equator
Pickup trucks
Rear-wheel-drive vehicles
All-wheel-drive vehicles
2000s cars
2010s cars